Samrong is a district (amphoe) in the western part of Ubon Ratchathani province, northeastern Thailand.

History
The minor district (king amphoe) Samrong was created on 15 April 1985, when the six tambons Samrong, Khok Kong, Nong Hai, Kho Noi, Non Ka Len, and Khok Sawang were split off from Warin Chamrap district. It was upgraded to a full district on 9 May 1992.

Geography
Neighboring districts are (from the north clockwise) Warin Chamrap and Det Udom of Ubon Ratchathani Province; and Non Khun and Kanthararom of Sisaket province.

Administration
The district is divided into nine sub-districts (tambon), which are further subdivided into 111 villages (muban). There are no municipal (thesaban) areas, and nine tambon administrative organizations (TAO).

References

External links
amphoe.com

Samrong